Venkatesananda Saraswati (or Swami Venkatesananda) 29 December 1921 in Tanjore, South India–2 December 1982 in Johannesburg, South Africa), known previously as Parthasarathy, was a disciple of Sivananda Saraswati. He received his spiritual training at the Divine Life Society in Rishikesh, India, and disseminated his master's teachings in South Africa, Mauritius, Australia, and New Zealand.

Venkatesananda said that he had been specially commissioned by his master, Sivananda, to spread the gospel of goodness – the four words: "Be good, do Good".

Swami Venkatesananda is also referred to as Siva-Pada-Renu (dust of Siva's feet), a title conferred to him by Swami Sivananda, his guru.

Bibliography

External links
Website dedicated to Swami Venkatesananda's life and works
Celebration of the Teachings of Swami Venkatesananda
A short biography. Blog maintained by a disciple in Thailand
Numerous video recordings of Swami Venkatesananda's talks and bio

20th-century Hindu religious leaders
People from Thanjavur district
1921 births
1982 deaths